Karl Neuse (31 December 1930 – 6 April 2022) was a German water polo player. He competed in the men's tournament at the 1956 Summer Olympics.

Neuse's club team was Wasserfreunde 98 Hannover.

See also
 Germany men's Olympic water polo team records and statistics
 List of men's Olympic water polo tournament goalkeepers

References

External links
 

1930 births
2022 deaths
Sportspeople from Hanover
German male water polo players
Water polo goalkeepers
Olympic water polo players of the United Team of Germany
Water polo players at the 1956 Summer Olympics